Azaxia luteilinea is a moth of the family Notodontidae first described by Herbert Druce in 1904. It is found in south-eastern Peru.

References

Moths described in 1904
Notodontidae
Moths of South America